Hyundai Group was a South Korean chaebol, controlled by  Chung Ju-yung until his death in 2001, which has been broken up into numerous independent companies. The term may also refer to many of these successor companies, including:
 Hyundai Asan, a division of the remnant Hyundai Group
 Hyundai Department Store Group
 HDC Group
 Hyundai Engineering (HEC)
 Hyundai Electronics, renamed as Hynix in 2001
 Hyundai Heavy Industries Group
 Hyundai Heavy Industries, a division of Hyundai Heavy Industries Group
 Hyundai Marine & Fire Insurance
 Hyundai Merchant Marine
 Hyundai Motor Group
 Hyundai Engineering and Construction, a subsidiary of Hyundai Motor Group
 Hyundai Motor Company, a division of Hyundai Motor Group